The Kabaddi World Cup, is an indoor international Kabaddi competition conducted by the International Kabaddi Federation (IKF) in a standard style, contested by men's and women's national teams. The competition has been previously contested in 2004, 2007, 2016. All three tournaments have been won by India. In 2016, the very first Kabaddi World Cup for women was held in India. The current format of the competition involves a round-robin group stage, with 5 teams in 2 pools, with the first and second place finishers of each group progressing to the semi-finals.

Summary

Men

Medal table

Current IKF ranking 
Points are calculated after every match by the formula:

10*(total number of kabaddi nations – (rank of the opponent)+(score difference)

The top 10 teams according to the International Kabaddi Federation:

Current LITS rankings 

Complete wealth and population adjusted elo rankings for previous 3 years. This also includes matches from Asian competitions.

References

External links
 Official website

World Cup
Kabbadi, Standard